Chloreuptychia hewitsonii is a species of butterfly in the family Nymphalidae. It is found in Brazil (Pará), Suriname and Ecuador.

References

Butterflies described in 1867
Euptychiina
Nymphalidae of South America
Taxa named by Arthur Gardiner Butler